La Visitation-de-l'Île-Dupas is a municipality in the Lanaudière region of Quebec, Canada, part of the D'Autray Regional County Municipality. Its territory is located on several of the Sorel Islands in the Saint Lawrence River where it flows into Lac Saint-Pierre. The largest of these islands is Dupas Island (Île Dupas), also known as Isle du Pads (or Isle du Pas), Île d'Angoulème, and Île du Richelieu at various times in the past.

The area is known for its geese, ducks, and muskrats, and it is suitable for farming, hunting and fishing.

History
The islands were already well known by the indigenous people as a good fishing and hunting location, and they used them to counter repeated attacks by the French.

The first Frenchman settling on the largest island was reputedly Pierre Dupas (1637-1677), officier in the Carignan Regiment who arrived in Canada in 1665. Together with two servants, he settled in 1669 on the island which came to bear his name, and he became the first Lord of the l'Île-Dupas-et-du-Chicot Seignory in 1672. In 1677, his widow sold the seignory to Charles Aubert de La Chesnaye.

On November 10, 1690, Louis Dandonneau, Sieur Du Sablé, and his brother-in-law, Jacques Brisset de Courchesne, both from Champlain, Quebec, purchased the seigneurie of l'Île-du-Pas-et-du-Chicot from Aubert at the cost of 1,500 livres. The following decade saw permanent settlement begin on the island. From 1712 to 1727, explorer Pierre Gaultier de Varennes, sieur de La Vérendrye, lived on the island and his five children were born there.

In 1834, the Parish of L'Isle-du-Pads was founded, followed by the civil parish in 1842. In 1845, the Municipality of L'Isle-du-Pads was established, but abolished in 1847, when it became part of the Berthier County Municipality. In 1855, it was reestablished as a parish municipality called La Visitation-de-la-Sainte-Vierge-de-l'Isle-du-Pads, one of the longest place names in Quebec history.

In 1865, the area experienced a flood which killed 15 people and washed away 27 houses. By the end of the 19th century, more than 1,000 people lived on the island, and in the early 20th century, almost the entire island was used for growing hay, which was exported to the United States in large quantities.

In 1897, the municipality lost about half of its territory when the new Parish Municipality of Saint-Ignace-de-Loyola was formed. In 1981, the parish municipality abbreviated its name and changed its status to become the Municipality of La Visitation-de-l'Île-Dupas.

Demographics
Population trend:
 Population in 2011: 619 (2006 to 2011 population change: 1.1%)
 Population in 2006: 612
 Population in 2001: 573
 Population in 1996: 564
 Population in 1991: 521

Private dwellings occupied by usual residents: 274 (total dwellings: 303)

Mother tongue:
 English as first language: 0%
 French as first language: 98.4%
 English and French as first language: 0%
 Other as first language: 1.6%

Education

The Sir Wilfrid Laurier School Board operates anglophone public schools, including:
 Joliette Elementary School in Saint-Charles-Borromée
 Joliette High School in Joliette

See also
List of municipalities in Quebec

References

External links
Municipalité de La Visitation-de-l'Île Dupas - MRC d'Autray

Incorporated places in Lanaudière
Municipalities in Quebec
1669 establishments in the French colonial empire